East Village is a housing development in Stratford, East London that was designed and constructed as the Olympic Village of the 2012 Summer Olympics and has been converted for use as a new residential district, complete with independent shops, bars and restaurants. The area was formerly contaminated waste land and industrial buildings to the north of Stratford town centre.

History

Planning and construction

As part of the regeneration programme within the bid for the 2012 Summer Olympics, the Olympic Village design to house the athletes was based on reusing the buildings after the games as a new residential district for Stratford. The basis for the residential plan was taken from the SCDC regeneration plan for the area as a consequence of the creation of the London-Paris high speed link. The spoil from the tunnel which went underground at Stratford created the platform on which Westfield Shopping Centre and the Olympic Village was created. Through a competitive bidding process, the then Labour British government chose a proposal by Lend Lease which covered financing and construction of both the Olympic Village and part of the London Olympics Media Centre. This would both provide accommodation for 22,500 athletes and team officials, 16,000 as Olympic and 6,500 as Paralympic built to Life Time Home standards to support the Paralympic residents and future residents with impairments or other physical challenges:afterwards provide a mix of low cost and private residential housing, within a community that would comprise offices, shops, schools and a health centre.

Cilantro Engineering were appointed to work as part of a collaborative team to deliver Design and Build MEP Installations for the main contractor, Lend Lease.

Lend Lease engaged a team of: architects Fletcher Priest; structural engineers Arup; and urban planning/landscape architecture firm West 8 and Vogt Landscape. They were briefed to design a village-garden type district to fit in with the wider urban park vision of the Olympic Park legacy, emulating the classical Victorian architecture layout of Maida Vale and other parts of Victorian west London. On a  site, the plan provided for 14 residential plots, each made up of 5 to 7 blocks, built around communal squares and courtyards, with water features accentuating the closeness of the River Lea. Each of the 69 blocks is of between 8 and 12 storeys high, nominally laid out: Street level of mostly three-storey townhouses, with front doors on street level to create an "active frontage". These are supplemented by a mix of single to three-storey shops and offices. Floor 3 and above in the centre of the complex are communal raised gardens, which hide carparks beneath. At and above this level are a mix of low cost and private residential apartments, ranging from studio to five bedroom. Each apartment provides generous floor spacing, and each includes its own balcony that is big enough for a table and chairs.

The whole Olympic Park site was proposed to be secured under a Compulsory Purchase Order (CPO) by the London Development Agency. In late 2005, a row broke out between then Mayor of London Ken Livingstone and Newham Council/Westfield Group over the use of the legal instrument. The site for the Olympic Village was to be located next to the £4Bn development of Stratford City, but access difficulties meant that the Olympic Park CPO extended onto the site for Stratford City. In November 2005, an agreement was made whereby the CPO over the Westfield site was removed, subject to agreed access provisions to the Olympic Village.

In light of the 2008 financial crisis, Lend Lease found difficulties in raising funds on the commercial markets for the construction of the village, the single largest project in the 2012 Summer Olympics scheme. The government via the Olympic Delivery Authority (ODA) hence agreed to underwrite a greater part of the required sum, and a scale-back of the project scale by 25%, on the proviso that athletes competing in non-London based events would be housed locally to their competition, that three of the plots would be deferred until the post-Games period, plots 5,6 & 8. This did not solve the challenge of providing Games time bed numbers. A Games design plan was created which introduced temporary walls within the legacy design so create more bed spaces: thus a 2-bed space, single bedroom apartment became 4; a four-bed apartment, 2 bedrooms became 6 and six bed apartment became 8 mainly by dividing the open plan lounge, dining and kitchen areas. Everything was retrofitted back to the original concept after the Games. Only the town houses over three levels were not subject to this Games time modification but still increased bed spaces from legacy 6 to 8 by use of the separate lounge. Following the athletes' experiences in Beijing 2008, and in particular through comments concerning athletes' welfare by International Olympic Committee President Jacques Rogge, this compromise was to be reconsidered whilst pressure built for the finance deal to be resolved.

Up until this point, the proposed site had been a mix of former industrial buildings and contaminated waste land. The proposed site for the village provided two living camp sites for Irish Travellers, one on Clays Lane, Newham, and a second on Waterden Crescent, Hackney. The final part of the Olympic CPO covering the village site, secured in December 2006, was unsuccessfully challenged by the travellers in the High Court in May 2007. Towards the end of demolition/site clearance, on 12 November 2007 a fire broke out in an old industrial warehouse on Waterden Road, Hackney Wick, on the western edge of the proposed Olympic village site.

Olympic and Paralympic village 

During the summer of 2012, the first use for the blocks was as the Olympic Village for the 2012 Summer Olympics. Taking the original design, the architects added temporary partitioning to create "hotel" style apartments catering for: 3,300 apartments: each to have a TV, internet access, and a private courtyard; and 17,320 beds (this is around 17,000 for athletes ~ 10903 (total number of them) and rest for officials during the Games): providing each athlete with  floor space. The village also included a plaza, where athletes were able to meet with friends and family. During the games

There is a full list of the buildings and the athletes that stayed in them during the 2012 Olympics, and plaques in all East Village building foyers mark which countries stayed there. For example, the British team stayed in Calla House, Kotata House and Tayberry House; Greece in Hopground House; Spain in Carina House; Ukraine in Emperor House; Japan in Applegate House; Armenia, Peru and Slovenia in Calico House; Belgium, Cape Verde and Kyrgyzstan in Frye House; Costa Rica And Yemen in Galena House; And the Netherlands in Heinieken House.

After the Games

After the conclusion of the games, the Olympic housing was adapted to create a new residential quarter to be known as East Village. The new construction created 2,818 new homes, including 1,379 affordable homes and houses, for sale and rent. The wider community is planned with wide vistas filled with gardens, parks and communal areas, within which are to be housed a school, a health clinic and shops. Having sold the affordable homes to Triathlon Homes in 2009 for £268 million, a competitive tender was issued in 2008 for ODA's interests in the remaining 1,439 private homes, along with six adjacent future development plots with the potential for a further 2,000 new homes, and long-term management of East Village.

The ODA received three bids: a joint-venture between Jamie Ritblat's Delancey and Qatari Diar; Hutchison Whampoa; and Wellcome Trust, who bid to take over all the  Olympic park. In August 2011, the ODA announced an agreement with Delancey/Qatari Diar, who paid £557 million for the East Village site, representing an estimated £275 million loss to the ODA and hence the British taxpayer. Culture Secretary Jeremy Hunt commented that the ODA never expected to recoup building costs: "It was an entirely empty site, it didn't have any infrastructure, roads or parks. There was always going to be a public sector contribution to help put those in."

Temporary partitions installed during the games are being removed to create a range of one to five-bed homes, ranging from apartments to townhouses. The hotel style designed rooms were converted to include kitchens. 1,439 private homes are let on a rental basis, instead of being sold, with the ownership remaining with Delancey/Qatari Diar and managed by Get Living London. This created the first UK private sector residential fund of over 1,000 homes to be owned and directly managed as an investment. In addition, the developers created new parklands and additional transport links. A health centre for residents of East Village and the surrounding areas has also been constructed. Independent retailers have been brought in to East Village, which is now a neighbourhood in its own right.

The developers also added Chobham Academy, a new education campus with 1,800 places for students aged 3–19. During the Olympics, the school building was used as the main base for organising and managing teams. Rebuilt after the games, it opened in September 2013 as Chobham Academy, home to an education campus, comprising nursery, primary and secondary schools; an adult learning facility; and a community arts complex. In July 2015 Chobham Academy was rated 'Outstanding' by OFSTED.

Transport

East Village is located at Stratford International station with fast services to central London (in 5–6 minutes) via High Speed One, on Southeastern trains, but not Eurostar, whose trains do not stop at Stratford International station. The Docklands Light Railway gives direct access to much of the east of London, and is one stop from Stratford station, which itself gives access to the Great Eastern Main Line (services operated by Greater Anglia and TfL Rail), c2c services (weekends only), the North London line (services operated by London Overground) and the London Underground Jubilee and Central lines.

London Bus routes 97, 108, 308 and 339 and night route N205 serve East Village. Also, route D8 stops nearby at Stratford International and routes 58, 69 and 158 stops nearby on Leyton High Road along with route 97.

At the time of the Olympics Stratford and Stratford International Stations were located in Travelcard Zone 3 During the Olympics, for every competition day there an all-zones free travel day card. As of January 2016 Stratford station and Stratford International station have been moved to Zone 2/3.

Sustainability

Residential accommodation was designed to achieve Code for Sustainable Homes Level 4 on 8 September 2012.

Plot N25, car park for Stratford International Station achieved CEEQUAL Excellent on 8 September 2012.

Permanent and temporary timber used was externally verified and audited and the project achieved Full Project FSC certification (2009: TT-PRO-002826) on 31 January 2012.

In construction the project achieved three Gold awards from the Considerate Constructors Scheme in 2010, 2011 and 2012, project registration references: 32454,36861 and 46760.

See also
Venues of the 2012 Summer Olympics and Paralympics
London 2012 Olympic Legacy

References

Cilantro Engineering

External links

Official website
Olympic Village @ London 2012 
East Village London, Get Living

Redevelopment projects in London
Stratford, London
2012 Summer Olympics
Residential buildings completed in 2012
Buildings and structures in the London Borough of Newham
Queen Elizabeth Olympic Park
Housing estates in London
Areas of London
Privately owned public spaces
Olympic Villages